Mechthild Wittmann (born 12 December 1967) is a German lawyer and politician of the Christian Social Union in Bavaria (CSU) who has been serving as a member of the Bundestag since 2021.

Early life and education
Wittmann was born 1967 in Munich and the daughter of politician Fritz Wittmann. She studied mechanical engineering at the Technical University of Munich and law at the Ludwig Maximilian University of Munich.

Political career
Wittmann joined the CSU in 1983.

Wittmann was a member of the State Parliament of Bavaria 2013 to 2018, where she served on the Committee on Legal Affairs. 

Wittmann became a member of the Bundestag in the 2021 elections. In parliament, she serves on the Committee on Internal Affairs and the Committee on Tourism. She is also one of the parliament's two representatives on the Europol Joint Parliamentary Scrutiny Group.

Other activities
 Kempten University of Applied Sciences, Member of the Board of Trustees (since 2022)

References

1967 births
Living people
Politicians from Munich
Christian Social Union in Bavaria politicians
Members of the Bundestag for Bavaria
Members of the Bundestag 2021–2025
Female members of the Bundestag
21st-century German women politicians